The W.T. Lawler House is a historic mansion in Martin, Tennessee, USA. It was completed in 1880. It was built for W.T. Lawler, a veteran of the Confederate States Army during the American Civil War and physician. It has been listed on the National Register of Historic Places since March 25, 1982.

References

Houses on the National Register of Historic Places in Tennessee
Houses completed in 1880
Houses in Weakley County, Tennessee
National Register of Historic Places in Weakley County, Tennessee